Collix hypospilata is a moth in the family Geometridae. It was described by Achille Guenée in 1857. It is endemic to Sri Lanka.

Description
Palpi with the second joint reaching far beyond the frontal tuft. Mid tibia of male very much dilated and with a deep groove. Abdomen long, with a large anal tuft. The male is dark fuscous with a slight purplish tinge. Wings with numerous indistinct waved black lines. Forewings with a prominent discocellulars boss of raised scales. The veins speckled with pale brown between waved lines. Hindwings with small discocellular spots. Both wings with submarginal series of pale brown specks and a black marginal line interrupted by pale specks at the vein. Ventral side fuscous brown. Both wings with very prominent black cell-spot, less prominent curved postmedial band. There is a prominent submarginal black spot series. A spot found between vein 3 and 4 absent.

Female often with brownish ground color or with brown patches in the cell of forewings and forming an obscure postmedial band to both wings.

References

hypospilata
Moths described in 1857
Moths of Sri Lanka
Taxa named by Achille Guenée